Leander Paes and David Rikl were defending champions. Rikl was also the two-time defending champion, having won the title with Joshua Eagle in 2002.

Paes and Rikl defended their title, defeating wildcard entry Marc Rosset and Stan Wawrinka in the final, 6–4, 6–2.

Seeds
Champion seeds are indicated in bold text while text in italics indicates the round in which those seeds were eliminated.

Draw

External links
 2004 Allianz Suisse Open Gstaad Doubles Draw

Swiss Open (tennis)
2004 ATP Tour
2004 Allianz Suisse Open Gstaad